Pennsylvania Dutch cuisine is the typical and traditional fare of the Pennsylvania Dutch. According to one writer, "If you had to make a short list of regions in the United States where regional food is actually consumed on a daily basis, the land of the Pennsylvania Dutch—in and around Lancaster County, Pennsylvania—would be at or near the top of that list," mainly because the area is a cultural enclave of Pennsylvania Dutch culture. 

Pennsylvania Dutch cuisine reflects influences of the Pennsylvania Dutch's German heritage, agrarian society, and rejection of rapid change.

It is common to find Pennsylvania Dutch cuisine throughout the Philadelphia/Delaware Valley region.

Techniques
In the 18th century baking was still done in wood-fired ovens that produced inconsistent results and could easily become too hot. The Pennsylvania Dutch baked pastries on cabbage leaves to provide some protection from hot spots that could develop in the oven.

Soups
Soups, often featuring egg noodles, are characteristic of the Pennsylvania Dutch. Pennsylvanian Dutch homes have traditionally had many broths on hand (vegetable, fish, poultry, and other meats) from the saving of any extra liquids available: "The Pennsylvania Dutch developed soup making to such a high art that complete cookbooks could be written about their soups alone; there was an appropriate soup for every day of the year, including a variety of hot and cold fruit soups." Soups were traditionally divided into different categories, including Sippli or "little soup" (a light broth), Koppsupper or "cup soups", Suppe (thick, chowder soups, often served as a meal with bread), and G'schmorte (a soup with no broth, often like a Brieh (Brei) or gravy).

Pennsylvania Dutch soups are often thickened with a starch, such as mashed potatoes, flour, rice, noodles, fried bread, dumplings, and Riwwels or rivels (small dumplings described as "large crumbs" made from "rubbing egg yolk and flour between the fingers"), from the German verb for "to rub."

Pennsylvania Dutch specialties

Beverages
 Birch beer
 Root beer

Dishes
 Amish potato salad
 Apple butter
 Apple dumpling—cored and peeled apple, covered in a pie-crust, dusted with sugar or cinnamon, and baked. Served in a bowl with milk. Sometimes eaten as dessert, but generally a meal in and of itself.
 Beef or venison jerky
 Bova Shankel—a pierogi-type dish of potato dumplings and sauce.
 Brown butter noodles—egg noodles combined with butter that was melted and browned in a pan.
 Hot bacon dressing—cooked, drained, crumbled bacon in a thickened sweet dressing, served hot over fresh salad greens; often used with dandelion greens to offset their tart taste.
 Bacon gravy
 Chicken and waffles
 Chicken corn soup—made with egg noodles and sometimes saffron, which has been cultivated in Pennsylvania Dutch country since the early 19th century; egg noodles, corn, hard boiled eggs, and chicken. Sometimes an addition is rivels, small dumplings.
 Chow-chow
 Coleslaw
 Cup cheese
 Gingerbread, ginger snaps, ginger cake, and pot roast spiced with ginger and other aromatic spices.
 Hamloaf—a meatloaf-like dish made of ground ham, often baked with brown sugar on top, lacking the spices and bread crumbs found in meatloaf.
 Hog maw—pig's stomach, called Seimaaga in the Pennsylvania Dutch dialect.
 Lebanon bologna
 Peanut butter schmear
 Pepper cabbage—a sweet and sour dish
 Pork and sauerkraut
 Potato filling
 Potato rolls
 Pot pie—not the baked pie with a pastry top, but a meat stew with large noodles (pot pie squares); often features chicken, flour, salt, vegetables (such as celery, onion, and carrots) as well as spices (such as parsley, thyme, black pepper, and bay leaf).
 Pretzel
 Red beet eggs (pickled beet eggs)
 Sauerbraten—sour roast, is any one of various meats and spices that are marinated for several days in vinegar or wine, vegetables are added to the marinade during the final day.  Sauerbraten was traditionally made using horse meat, but beef or other cuts of meat are now favored.  It is often served with dumplings and red cabbage.  Sauerbraten remains very popular throughout Germany.
 Schnitz un knepp
 Scrapple

Desserts

Angel food cake
Apple dumplings
Dutch baby pancake
Church spread—made from molasses or corn syrup, marshmallow cream, and peanut butter, often found at Amish church services and community events.
Cracker pudding—thickened with saltine crackers
Fastnachts
Funnel cake
Funny cake—a combination of pie and cake that is made by baking a cake surrounded by pie crust, marbled throughout with chocolate streaks.
Whoopie pie
Montgomery pie—buttery crust with a gooey molasses and lemon filling and a buttermilk cake topping.
Moravian sugar cake
Shoofly pie—molasses crumb cake with a pie crust for easier eating.
Sugar cookies

See also
 Cuisine of Philadelphia
Smorgasbord

Notes

External links
PA Dutch Country recipes
Berks County Pennsylvania Dutch recipes
Pennsylvania Dutch recipes from Chester County, the Lehigh Valley, etc.

Pennsylvania Dutch
 
Amish in Pennsylvania
Pennsylvania Dutch